The 2016–17 Southern Jaguars basketball team represented Southern University during the 2016–17 NCAA Division I men's basketball season. The Jaguars, led by sixth-year head coach Roman Banks, played their home games at the F. G. Clark Center in Baton Rouge, Louisiana as members of the Southwestern Athletic Conference. They finished the season 15–18, 10–8 in SWAC play to finish in a four-way tie for third place. As the 3-seed in the SWAC tournament they defeated Jackson State before losing in the semifinals to Alcorn State.

On March 31, head coach Roman Banks, who had been serving as Southern's interim Athletic Director for almost two years, was promoted to full time Athletic Director and stepped down as basketball coach. He finished his coaching career at Southern with a six year record of 114–85.

Previous season
The Jaguars finished the 2015–16 season 22–13, 11–7 record in SWAC play to finish in fourth place. They defeated Alabama State, top-seeded Texas Southern, and Jackson State in the SWAC tournament to earn the conference's automatic bid to the NCAA tournament as a No. 16 seed. They lost to Holy Cross in the First Four.

Roster

Schedule and results

|-
!colspan=9 style=| Non-conference regular season

|-
!colspan=9 style=| SWAC regular season

|-
!colspan=9 style="background:#; color:white;"| SWAC tournament

References

Southern Jaguars basketball seasons
Southern
South
South